The 2009 Allstate Sugar Bowl was the 75th annual edition of the annual college football bowl game that is part of the 2008–09 bowl season of the Bowl Championship Series (BCS) 2008 NCAA Division I FBS football season. The game was played on Friday, January 2, 2009 at the Louisiana Superdome in New Orleans, Louisiana between the Utah Utes, champions of the Mountain West Conference, and the Alabama Crimson Tide, representing the Southeastern Conference.

The Sugar Bowl usually takes the champion of the SEC and pits them against an At-Large BCS team. However, with the 2008 SEC Champion, Florida Gators being selected to play for the national championship game, the Sugar Bowl selected two At-Large BCS teams. The bowl kept their traditional ties with the Southeastern Conference for the second consecutive year though, in selecting the Alabama Crimson Tide with an at-large selection.

In the 2009 edition of this bowl game, the No. 6 Utes pulled off an upset of the heavily favored No. 4 Crimson Tide by a score of 31–17. Utah quarterback Brian Johnson was named Most Outstanding Player of the game. With this win, Utah completed the 2008 season as the only undefeated, 13–0 Division I FBS team in the nation, along with becoming the first team from a BCS non-AQ conference to win two BCS bowls. It was also Utah's first win over a Southeastern Conference school. Andre Smith (Alabama starting left tackle and 2008 Outland Trophy winner) was suspended for the game because he declined to cooperate with an investigation by the school's compliance staff on the issue with his uncle's illegal contact with a sports agent. A few days later, he declared himself for the NFL Draft and was the 6th overall pick.

Scoring summary

References

2008–09 NCAA football bowl games
2009
2009
2009
2009 in sports in Louisiana
21st century in New Orleans
January 2009 sports events in the United States